Yeison Rogelio Delgado Ortega (born 14 April 1977 in Cúcuta, Colombia) is a Venezuelan professional racing cyclist. He was caught doping in the 2004 Vuelta a Guatemala, alongside Abel Jochola, Nery Velázquez, David Calanche, Noel Velázquez (2nd), Carlos López (3rd), Reynaldo Murillo and Federico Muñoz.

Major results

2001
 1st Stage 4 Vuelta a Colombia
2003
 3rd Overall Vuelta al Táchira
1st Stage 9
2004
 6th Overall Vuelta al Táchira
7th Overall Vuelta a Guatemala
2007
 3rd Overall Vuelta a Yacambu-Lara
1st Stage 4
 6th Overall Vuelta al Táchira
 7th Overall Vuelta a Colombia
 9th Overall Clásico Ciclístico Banfoandes
2008
 2nd Overall Vuelta al Táchira
 4th Road race, National Road Championships
2009
 8th Overall Vuelta a Venezuela
2010
 8th Overall Vuelta a Venezuela
2011
 3rd Overall Vuelta Ciclista Chiapas
 5th Overall Vuelta al Táchira
 6th Overall Vuelta a Bolivia
2012
 5th Overall Vuelta al Táchira
2013
 1st Overall Vuelta al Táchira
1st Stage 7
2014
 4th Overall Vuelta al Táchira
 10th Overall Vuelta a Venezuela
2015
 3rd Overall Vuelta al Táchira
2016
 4th Overall Vuelta al Táchira

Notes

External links

1977 births
Living people
Venezuelan male cyclists
Colombian male cyclists
Venezuelan sportspeople in doping cases
Colombian sportspeople in doping cases
Doping cases in cycling
People from Norte de Santander Department